Mario Kröpfl (born 21 December 1989) is an Austrian professional footballer who plays as a midfielder for Austrian Bundesliga club TSV Hartberg.

Club career
In late 2021, Kröpfl signed a contract with TSV Hartberg until the summer of 2024.

Notes

1989 births
Living people
Austrian footballers
Association football midfielders
SK Austria Kärnten players
FC Gratkorn players
Wolfsberger AC players
SV Horn players
SV Lafnitz players
TSV Hartberg players
Austrian Football Bundesliga players
2. Liga (Austria) players
Austrian Regionalliga players